Whitney Osuigwe (born April 17, 2002) is an American tennis player.

In 2017, Osuigwe was the ITF Junior World Champion. She won the juniors 2017 French Open to become the first American to win the girls' singles event in Paris in 28 years.

Personal life
Osuigwe has been playing tennis at the IMG Academy since age six, where her father Desmond has been a teacher at the academy since 1997 and acts as her primary coach. Desmond is from Lagos in Nigeria and played professional tennis events at the ITF Futures level before coming to the United States to attend college. Whitney has an older brother named Deandre who is a college basketball player and a younger sister named Victoria who also plays tennis.

Junior career
In June 2017, Osuigwe climbed to No. 2 in the junior rankings by dominating the clay-court events in the previous six months. She started by reaching the semifinals at the Orange Bowl in December, and then won two Grade-1 clay-court tournaments in back-to-back weeks in February. Osuigwe capped off her dominance in this part of the season by winning the 2017 Junior French Open over fellow American Claire Liu.

In doing so, she became the first American to win the girls' event since Jennifer Capriati in 1989, the fifth American champion overall, and the ninth youngest winner of the event at under 15 years and 2 months. This was also only the second time the final was contested between two Americans, with the other occurring in 1980.

Osuigwe would go on to finish the season as the No.-1-ranked junior in the world, for which she was named the combined 2017 ITF Junior World Champion. Furthermore, she then won the Orange Bowl before the year came to a close.

On August 12, 2018, Osuigwe won the USTA Girls 18s National Championships which earned her a wildcard entry into the main draw of the US Open.

Professional career
Osuigwe made her WTA Tour main-draw debut at the 2018 Miami Open, losing to her fellow wildcard and junior rival Claire Liu.

In January 2019, Osuigwe played alongside David Ferrer on the Spain team in the 2019 Hopman Cup, replacing Garbiñe Muguruza who was out due to injury. Osuigwe played only the mixed-doubles match, losing to the French team which consisted of Lucas Pouille and Alizé Cornet. In March, she entered the Miami Open main draw as a wildcard, winning her first-round match against fellow wildcard Mari Osaka, the sister of Naomi Osaka.

Performance timeline

Only main-draw results in WTA Tour, Grand Slam tournaments, Fed Cup/Billie Jean King Cup and Olympic Games are included in win–loss records.

Singles
Current through the 2022 Australian Open.

ITF Circuit finals

Singles: 5 (2 titles, 3 runner-ups)

Doubles: 7 (4 titles, 3 runner-ups)

ITF Junior Circuit

Junior Grand Slam finals

Singles: 1 (1 title)

Doubles: 2 (2 runner-ups)

Junior Circuit finals

Singles: 10 (7 titles, 3 runner–ups)

Doubles: 9 (4 titles, 5 runner–ups)

References

External links
 
 

2002 births
Living people
American female tennis players
African-American female tennis players
Sportspeople from Bradenton, Florida
French Open junior champions
American sportspeople of Nigerian descent
Tennis people from Florida
Grand Slam (tennis) champions in girls' singles
21st-century African-American sportspeople
21st-century African-American women